The Future Investment Initiative Institute, or FII Institute, is a non-profit organization run by the Public Investment Fund, Saudi Arabia's main sovereign wealth fund.

Future Investment Initiative
The Future Investment Initiative was announced in September 2017 by the Public Investment Fund, Saudi Arabia's main sovereign wealth fund, in the context of the Saudi Vision 2030 program of economic and social reform.

FII Institute's Board of Trustees includes HE Yasir Al-Rumayyan, HRH Princess Reema bint Bandar Al Saud, HE Mohamed Alabbar, HE Matteo Renzi, Dr. Peter Diamandis, Professor Tony F. Chan, Professor Adah Almutairi, and CEO Richard Attias. The first board meeting took place in April 2020.

The first Future Investment Initiative conference took place in Riyadh from 24–26 October 2017. Notable participants included the managing director of the IMF Christine Lagarde, US Treasury Secretary Steven Mnuchin, BlackRock CEO Larry Fink, and SoftBank CEO Masayoshi Son. In an address to the conference, Crown Prince Mohammad bin Salman said Saudi Arabia was returning to a more moderate form of Islam "open to all religions and to the world". The event was colloquially referred to by some media and commentators as "Davos in the Desert". The World Economic Forum, which organizes the annual conference held in Davos, Switzerland, has objected to the use of "Davos" in such contexts for any event not organized by them. The fourth edition of FII took place in a hybrid format on 26–28 January 2021. The Public Investment Fund has used the conferences to make announcements, including its goal to increase its assets under management to $400 billion by 2020, as well investments.

Assassination of Jamal Khashoggi 

Following the killing in Turkey of Saudi journalist Jamal Khashoggi in October 2018, some speakers and sponsors who had planned to attend the event withdrew, as part of an attempt to distance themselves from the government of Saudi Arabia. These included Los Angeles Times owner Patrick Soon-Shiong, the president of the World Bank Jim Yong Kim, and Viacom CEO Bob Bakish.

Media outlets including The New York Times, the Financial Times, CNBC, Bloomberg, and CNN withdrew as partners. Google also issued a statement stating that Google Cloud Chief Executive Diane Greene would not be attending Future Investment Initiative Summit in Riyadh. Uber Chief Executive Dara Khosrowshahi said amid the concerns over Khashoggi disappearance, Uber would not be a part of the summit.

JPMorgan Chase CEO Jamie Dimon, Ford Executive Chairman Bill Ford, BlackRock CEO Larry Fink, The Blackstone Group CEO  Stephen Schwarzman, and US Treasury Secretary Steve Mnuchin also withdrew from the conference.

References 

Business conferences
21st-century conferences
Economy of Saudi Arabia
Annual events in Saudi Arabia